2015 Shenzhen Open – Singles may refer to:

2015 ATP Shenzhen Open – Singles
2015 WTA Shenzhen Open – Singles

See also
2015 Shenzhen Open